Elso Rivelino Carassa La Rosa (born 21 September 1974 in Callao) is a Peruvian football coach and a former player. He is an assistant manager with Sport Boys.

References

1974 births
Living people
Sportspeople from Callao
Association football defenders
Peruvian footballers
Sport Boys footballers
Deportivo Pesquero footballers
Deportivo Municipal footballers
Club Deportivo Wanka footballers
FC Spartak Vladikavkaz players
Russian Premier League players
Peruvian expatriate footballers
Expatriate footballers in Russia
FBC Melgar footballers
Peruvian football managers
Sport Boys managers